Hammerverse (or the Slammerverse, Slammers universe, Hammer universe) is a setting for a series of military science fiction short stories and novels by author David Drake.

The series follows the career of a future mercenary tank regiment called Hammer's Slammers, after their leader, Colonel Alois Hammer.

As with his other work, Drake borrows plots from historical or mythological sources for many of the Hammer's Slammers stories. For example, he retells the story of Jason and the Argonauts in The Voyage, and part of the Odyssey in Cross the Stars. Other stories borrow from pulp era fiction (The Sharp End is based on Dashiell Hammett's Red Harvest.)

Short essays in Hammer's Slammers provide details of the political, social, economic, and technological conditions in the Hammerverse.

The series

Original novels 
 Hammer's Slammers (1979): The initial collection of stories. Includes the creation of the Slammers as a mercenary unit, shows several of its campaigns, and the end of its independent existence when Colonel Hammer becomes the ruler of his native world, Friesland.
 At Any Price (1985): A study in command and cultural conflict. The Slammers must aid a human community in a fight with aliens who can teleport.
 Counting the Cost (1987): The Slammers become involved in an internal dispute among their employers. Based on the Nika riots, with Slammers Captain Tyl Koopman in the role of Belisarius.
 Rolling Hot (1989): A pick-up Slammers unit, Task Force Ranson, must make a rapid combat march to relieve the capital city which is under threat. Based loosely on the events of the Tet offensive, according to Drake's comments.
 The Warrior (1991): A rivalry between two of the Slammers, who have very different ideas of what it means to be a warrior. One of them, Slick Des Grieux, is based on the classical character of Achilles.
 The Sharp End (1993): A survey team from the Slammers is looking for work for the regiment. This book is set after Colonel Hammer has become President Hammer; Hammer's Regiment the 1st Friesian Defense Forces Regiment; and is based on Dashiell Hammett's Red Harvest.
 Paying the Piper (2002): Three novellas that follow a Slammers unit commander during a war between rival city states. The political situation is based on the war between Rhodes and Byzantium in the 3rd century BC
 Other short stories: A Death in Peacetime ("Oceans of the Mind", Spring 2005). The Day of Glory ("Elemental, The Tsunami Relief Anthology", Tor Books, 2006). Also in The Complete Hammer's Slammers, volumes 1 and 2 respectively.
 In October 2015, Drake contributed a new Slammers story, "Save What You Can", to the tribute anthology Onward, Drake!.

Repackaged 
The contents of the first five books of the main series were repackaged and republished, with some additional stories. Drake has said that this is his preferred order and edition.

 The Tank Lords (1997)
 Caught In The Crossfire (1998)
 The Butcher's Bill (1998)

The Complete Hammer's Slammers (2006): is a three volume set from Night Shade Books that contains all Hammer's Slammers fiction, including three new stories written for this set. Volume 1 was released in January 2006, and features an introduction by Gene Wolfe. Volume 2 (introduction by David G Hartwell) was released January 2007, with Volume 3 (introduction by Barry N. Malzberg) following in November 2007.

 Volume 1 contains: Hammer's Slammers (collection), “Code-Name Feirefitz”, “The Interrogation Team”, “The Tank Lords”, “Liberty Port”, “Night March”, “The Immovable Object”, “The Irresistible Force”, “A Death in Peacetime” (short stories)
 Volume 2 contains: At Any Price, Counting the Cost, Rolling Hot, The Warrior, “The Day of Glory” (short story)
 Volume 3 contains: The Sharp End, Paying the Piper, “The Darkness” (short story), “Jim” (short story)

Related works 
These are works set in the Slammers universe, and involving members of the Slammers, or former members, but not directly featuring the Slammers as an organization.

 Cross the Stars (1984): A retelling of the Odyssey, with former Slammers Captain Don "Mad Dog" Slade in the role of Odysseus.
 The Voyage (1993): A retelling of the Voyage of the Argonauts.

The Forlorn Hope (1984) is about another, smaller, low-rent body of mercenaries, Fasolini's Company, based on Xenophon's Anabasis or The March Upcountry. While the setting and themes of the novel are similar to those of the Hammerverse, Drake has confirmed that this novel is not part of the series.

A Hammer's Slammers board wargame was produced under license by Mayfair Games. Two sets of miniatures rules have been produced by Pireme Publishing
 Hammer's Slammers Handbook
 Hammer's Anvils: Handbook 2 The Opponents

A role playing supplement using the Traveller rules by Mongoose Publishing became available in June 2009.

Models of the vehicles for the Slammers Regiment and other forces are available from Brigade Models and infantry figures from Ground Zero Games.

John Treadaway also offers a Hammer's Slammers-based miniatures wargames ruleset called The Crucible at http://www.hammers-slammers.com/home.htm

Technology

Powerguns 
In the Hammer universe, a powergun is a weapon which projects high energy copper plasma toward its target. This plasma is created by inducing an electrical field in a precisely aligned group of copper atoms; the atoms' alignment causes a resonance which greatly amplifies the field energy and ionizes the atoms. The resulting plasma is directed by a firing chamber and barrel made of refractory metal, such as iridium; the chamber and barrel are cooled between shots by injected gas (typically nitrogen). The copper atoms are stored as individual charges, with the atoms held in the correct alignment by a plastic matrix which is mostly consumed by the firing. All the parts of a powergun require extremely precise machining and advanced materials, which makes powerguns very expensive; only the most successful mercenary units (or technologically advanced planets) can afford large numbers of powerguns. Powerguns are easily identified by the extremely bright cyan color of their plasma bolts; the electrical field also generates a broadband radio frequency discharge which can be picked up by the appropriate equipment. A powergun's recoil is far lower than a projectile weapon of equivalent size or firepower, as the copper atoms have low rest mass; the primary limit for powergun rate of fire is its ability to dissipate heat. Many smaller rapid fire powerguns use a multibarrel configuration, either a rotary gatling or a multi chamber mitrailleuse (the latter called a "calliope" in Slammers military slang.)

Powerguns are line of sight weapons. As a general rule, if you can see it, you can hit it. The upper limit of their range is not known. However, in one story a politician is killed with a shot to the head from a 1 cm pistol in the hands of a master marksman at a range of more than a mile. In another, part of a plot revolves around disabling the powergun equivalent of a heavy flak gun battery capable of hitting a spaceship in orbit. However, the plasma projected has one failing: the energy in the plasma will expend itself on the first object it hits, whether that is a leaf or an enemy soldier. Precision in aiming is key when using a powergun.

The operating characteristics and tactical employment of powerguns were chosen by the author, David Drake, to be roughly equivalent to the firearms he was familiar with; specifically, the M14 rifle, the M1928A1 Thompson submachine gun, the M1911A1 .45 ACP pistol, and the Browning M2 .50 caliber heavy machine gun. This allowed him to easily translate his experiences in Vietnam to a science fiction context.  The specifics of the powergun are inspired by Drake's interest in Fortean phenomena; the mechanism by which powerguns produce destructive plasma is similar to the working of a Tesla coil, and the destructive power of copper plasma is said (in the Slammers universe) to have resulted in the deaths of thousands in the 1902 eruption of Mount Pelee. (In reality, this was the result of a pyroclastic surge.)

Other weapons 
The Slammers have few standard issue weapons other than powerguns. Slammers infantry troops use grenades of various types in addition to their powerguns. The Regiment also maintains several batteries of self-propelled howitzers which fire rocket boosted shells. These include simple high explosive and smokescreen rounds, antipersonnel cluster bomb shells ("firecracker rounds"), sophisticated anti tank munitions with self-forging warheads similar to the present day CBU-97 Sensor Fuzed Weapon ("tank killers"), and tactical nuclear warheads ("red pills").  The Slammers occasionally use poison gas or incendiary weapons as area denial methods, and for eliminating threats in bunkers they do not choose to assault.

The Slammers (and similarly advanced units) make extensive use of powerguns for defense against aircraft, incoming artillery shells, and missiles.  The powerguns are computer controlled in air defense mode to achieve the needed precision and reaction time. Although Hammer's hovertanks have computers which are capable of individual air defense operation, the usual practice is for the regiment's Fire Central computer to take control of whatever tribarrels bear on the threat and use them to eliminate it. Some mercenary forces in the Slammers universe are specialized antiaircraft units (e.g., the United Defense Batteries; see Counting the Cost) which provide this service to clients who cannot afford to field the sophisticated technology required.

Forces other than the Slammers also use powerguns, along with a wide range of weapons. Most are similar in type to present day weapons, although they are generally smaller in size and of greater lethality. Newly established colony planets, which devote most of their production to bare survival, might produce low tech improvised firearms; at the other end of the scale, some well established planets can produce weapons such as high powered lasers or electromagnetic railguns and Gauss guns. These advanced weapons can approach powerguns in effectiveness, and even exceed them in some ways (albeit at comparable expense.)

Vehicles of Hammer's Regiment 
Hammer's Regiment uses air-cushion and ducted-fan motive systems for its vehicles. The primary fighting unit is an air cushion tank weighing 150 to 170 tonnes, armed with a 20 cm single barrel powergun as the main armament in the rotating turret and a 2 cm tribarrel powergun in a cupola. Standard battle tanks are crewed by one driver and one sergeant commander who doubles as the gunner. A command tank version exists, which adds stations in the turret for an officer and his communications technician along with the communications equipment necessary to command a tank company. Hammer's tanks have extremely heavy armor, with the main hull and turret made of iridium and heavy steel skirts surrounding the plenum chamber. The tank also is equipped with multiply redundant systems and state of the art artificial intelligence to assist the crew, particularly the vehicle commander.  Slammers tanks carry a continuous strip of directional mines above the skirts, to defend against infantry attacks and man-portable antitank missiles ("buzz bombs") launched at point blank range.

The tanks are supported by smaller "combat cars", armored air cushion vehicles that mount three 2 cm tribarrels. Combat cars have a crew of one driver, one vehicle commander who doubles as a gunner, and two wing gunners. The armor, sensors, redundancy, and artificial intelligence of the combat cars are not as extensive as those on the tanks. The combat car was inspired by Drake's recollection of the "ACAV" version of the M113 Armored Personnel Carrier. A command version of the standard combat car, essentially a steel box on a combat car chassis, exists. The command car's powerful computer and communications gear is useful for unit commanders, although many commanders choose instead to use a standard combat car as their command vehicle.

The Slammers also operate self-propelled artillery units and tank recovery vehicles, both of which are only equipped with splinter resistant armor. While these use the same air cushion propulsion system as the fighting vehicles, the sheer weight of these vehicles limits their maneuverability.

The Regiment's infantry uses very small air cushion vehicles to improve their mobility. These are either one man "skimmers" or two man "jeeps"; the latter can be equipped with tribarrel powerguns, mortars, or a variety of command and sensor modules.

Many vehicles in the Slammers universe, including all the armored fighting vehicles of Hammer's Regiment, are powered by magnetically contained fusion reactors. These are called "fusion bottles" in the Slammers universe. The high power density of these reactors allow the Slammers to combine high speed, heavy armor, and heavy weapons in their combat vehicles, albeit at extreme expense. Other vehicles of Hammer's Regiment are powered by fuel cells or high capacity batteries which can be recharged in the field from an armored vehicle's fusion reactor.

Other vehicles in the Slammers universe are not significantly advanced beyond modern vehicles, except in the specifics of materials and computer systems. One notable difference is that "aircars," similar to the Piasecki Airjeep, are common on many worlds.

FTL 
Starships in the Slammers universe use FTL drives to travel between star systems, or to travel short distances within a system. In the Slammers universe, the FTL drive is called "Transit drive." Distances between planets and star systems are measured in Transit Minutes, referring to the overall time spent in Transit "jumps". Travel by Transit usually involves a series of instantaneous short distance jumps followed by a period of recalculation; the calculations involved in Transit navigation take anywhere from ten to a hundred times as long as the actual Transit process. Distances of seventy Transit Minutes are considered extremely long, for instance.

The process by which Transit occurs is not explained in Slammers fiction. However, it appears to have some effect on the human brain as those who travel by Transit are disoriented and fatigued by the jump itself, and suffer severe headaches for a short time afterward. In addition, the distance between two points via Transit is not equivalent to the distance in normal space. Two star systems which are relatively close might be many Transit Minutes apart.

There is also a realtime communications system available in the Slammers universe called the Stadtler Communication Device. Its method of operation is unknown, but it is capable of instantaneously communicating to another Stadtler Device at distances up to kiloparsecs away. However, there is one absolute requirement to employ one. "The Stadtler Device could not be used to receive alone. Its principle, whatever it was, required balance: a biological intellect at either node of a communication." The Stadtler Devices are unbelievably expensive, likely non-human in origin, and are generally reserved for the use of the governments of the richest worlds in the Slammers universe.

References

External links 
 The Hammer's Slammers Wargame Official Website

Military science fiction
Science fiction book series